Rye Hill and Burstwick railway station is a disused railway station on the North Eastern Railway's Hull and Holderness Railway midway between Burstwick and Ryehill in the East Riding of Yorkshire, England. It was opened by the Hull and Holderness Railway on 27 June 1854. On 1 July 1881 it was renamed to Rye Hill and on 23 September 1929 changed name again this time to Rye Hill and Burstwick. The station was closed to passengers on 19 October 1964. It is now a private residence.

References

 
 

Disused railway stations in the East Riding of Yorkshire
Railway stations in Great Britain opened in 1854
Railway stations in Great Britain closed in 1964
Former North Eastern Railway (UK) stations
Hull and Holderness Railway